Giuliano Urbani (born 9 June 1937) is an Italian academic and politician. He was the minister of cultural heritage from 2001 to 2005.

Early life
Urbani was born in Perugia on 9 June 1937.

Career and activities
Urbani is an academic by profession. He taught political sciences at Bocconi University in Milan until 1994. He was also a collaborator of Fininvest.

He is the cofounder and a leading member of the Forza Italia led by Silvio Berlusconi. He contributed to the development of the party's ideology. From 11 May 1994 to 17 January 1995 he served as state minister for public administration and regional affairs in the first cabinet of Berlusconi. Urbani was appointed minister of cultural heritage to the second cabinet of Prime Minister Berlusconi on 10 June 2001. Urbani was in office until 23 April 2005 when he was replaced by Rocco Buttiglione in the post.

In addition, he served at the Italian Parliament for three successive terms from 1996 to 2005. He was elected from Lombardia with the Forza Italia in all terms. As of September 2020, he was a member of the Italian Aspen Institute.

References

External links

1937 births
Academic staff of Bocconi University
Forza Italia politicians
Culture ministers of Italy
Deputies of Legislature XII of Italy
Deputies of Legislature XIII of Italy
Deputies of Legislature XIV of Italy
Government ministers of Italy
Knights Grand Cross of the Order of Merit of the Italian Republic
The Liberals (Italy) politicians
Living people
People from Perugia
Politicians of Umbria